The twelfth World Cup of Softball was held between July 5-9, 2017, in Oklahoma City. Japan defended their championship by defeating the United States in the title game.

Participating teams
Seven countries participated in the tournament with the United States both sending their senior and junior team. The rankings of the national teams except the United States juniors team are included.

Preliminary round standings

Placement games 
Gold Medal Game

Bronze Medal Game

5th Place Game

7th Place Game

References 

World Cup of Softball
World Cup of Softball
World Cup of Softball